Peter Joseph Kentenich, SAC (16 November 1885 – 15 September 1968) was a Pallottine priest and founder of the Schoenstatt Apostolic Movement. He was a theologian, educator, and pioneer of a Catholic response to an array of modern issues, whose teachings underwent a series of challenges from political and ecclesiastical powers. He attempted to teach Christians how to live out their faith. His case for sainthood is currently at the diocesan level in the diocese of Trier, pending the compilation of his writings and correspondences.

Early life

Childhood 
Kentenich was born on November 16, 1885 in Gymnich, near Cologne, and baptized "Peter Josef Kentenich" on 19 November at the parish church of St.Kuniberts. His mother was Katharina Kentenich and his father was Matthias Köp, a manager on a farm in Oberbolheim, where Katharina was one of the domestic staff. Because his parents were not married (and never married), Joseph was born at the house of his maternal grandparents, Anna Maria and Matthias Kentenich, where he spent the first years of his life.
 
From the end of 1891 until the second half of 1892, Joseph lived with his mother in Strasbourg, where she worked as housekeeper for her elder brother, Peter Joseph, after his wife's death on 25 December 1891. The boy attended a school there for a few months. After her brother remarried on 25 June 1892, Katharina and her son returned to Gymnich. Katharina had to look for a permanent job in order to support her child. Joseph Kentenich was sent to St. Vincent orphanage in Oberhausen on 12 April 1894.

Upon arrival, Katharina gripped the neck of a statue of the Virgin Mary, a gold chain with a cross, one of the few precious objects she owned; she asked the Mother of Jesus to take care of the education of her son; then she put the cross on Joseph's neck.

Entrance into the seminary 
In 1897, Kentenich expressed the wish to become a priest for the first time. Two years later, he entered the Pallottines minor seminary in Ehrenbreitstein. In 1904, he entered the novitiate of the Pallottines in Limburg an der Lahn. In his diary, he formulated his spiritual journey, "God is my only goal, He must also be the star that guides my life." However, he faced difficulties because of his intellectualist character. He was obsessed by the primary philosophical question: "Is there a truth, and how to know it?" He had a strong aspiration for perfection, but felt great insensitivity, a sort of incapacity to love God and his neighbor. Marian devotion allowed him to overcome this crisis and discover the personal love that God, Jesus Christ and the Virgin Mary had for him, a love that is not an abstract idea but a living reality.

Priesthood 

Admitted to the religious profession in 1909, Kentenich was ordained as a priest in Limburg an der Lahn on 8 July 1910. Although he wished to become a missionary in Africa with the Pallottines, his poor health prevented him from doing so.

He was first a professor at the Minor Seminary of Ehrenbreistein. From 1912 to 1919, he served as spiritual director at the minor seminary of the Pallottine Fathers in Vallendar-Schoenstatt, near Koblenz (Germany) on the Rhine.

Chaplain 
Indeed, a storm stirred the seminarians of Vallendar-Schoenstatt: students protested against the internal regulations that they considered too severe, while some protesters spread graffiti on the walls. Two priests in charge of their spiritual direction resigned. Under this situation, a young Father Kentenich was named as a replacement to try to restore confidence among the seminarians.

In his first talk, he said to his students: "I am at your disposal with all that I am and all that I have: my knowledge and my ignorance, my competence and my incompetence, but especially my heart... We will learn to educate ourselves under the protection of Mary, to become strong, free and priestly men."

Founding the Schoenstatt Movement

Beginning the "Covenant of Love" with Mary 
 Kentenich interpreted the ideas of his order's founder, Vincent Pallotti, as a call for a worldwide effort to involve lay people in apostolic work, and to unite the various factions in the church. With some of his pupils, on 18 October 1914, Kentenich laid the first milestone of the foundation of the work of Schoenstatt. In an old chapel of St. Michael, formerly abandoned and used for the storage of the gardening tools, he gathered about twenty seminarians, where they sealed what he called the "Covenant of Love" with the Mother of God. What made this approach unique was that this "Covenant" is conceived not as a pious symbol, but a bilateral contract between the two contracting parties. Moreover, through the voice of the young priest, the Holy Virgin was requested to kindly establish Her throne in the chapel to spread Her treasures. Each group member agreed to give up now entirely to the Mother of God, and to let themselves be guided by Her through their existence. The group founded a Marian Congregation. This was the beginning and the lasting foundation of today's worldwide development of the Schoenstatt Movement. This movement was named after its place of origin, a word meaning "Beautiful Place".

Indeed, deeply convinced about Mary's love for all men, he implored by prayer and sacrifice for that small chapel becomes a privileged place of grace and that it may attract multitudes of men and educate them for the work of God's Kingdom. The speech he delivered on this occasion is considered the Schoenstatt Movement's Foundation Act.The young seminarians grasped his intentions and testified by their spirit of sacrifice during the difficult years of World War I. Some of them, amid the dangers of the front, sacrificed their lives for the cause of Schoenstatt. Among these, the Servant of God Joseph Engling was particularly distinguished: as fervent seminarian, and supporter of the peace between nations and an apostle among his fellow soldiers, his death was notable in the development of Schoenstatt. On 4 October 1918, he was killed by a shell in Northern France, next to Thun-Saint-Martin; and Father Kentenich would present him as a model. His process of beatification is underway.

In 1915, a teacher gave to Kentenich a picture of the Virgin Mary with her child. Despite the perceived low artistic value of the work, Kentenich was charmed by the tenderness of the gesture of Mary clutching Jesus on her heart; he placed the picture above the altar. Revered as Mater Ter Admirabilis (Mother Thrice Admirable), she was put in all the foundations of Schoenstatt. During the war, a magazine under the same patronage was sent to the youth fighting at the front.

Between WWI and WWII 
The project, initially purely local, expanded rapidly after the World War I. It gradually encompassed many categories; young people, priests, women, sisters, and pilgrims. They are structured according to the German practical spirit, with leagues, federations, and later with secular institutes, according to the degree of commitment of each of their members.

Father Kentenich traveled through all of Germany, Austria, Czechoslovakia, and Switzerland, to preach retreats and lead training sessions. From 1928 to 1935, he preached every year for more than 2,000 priests, and many other lay retreatants.

In 1926, Kentenich founded the Schoenstatt Sisters of Mary.

During Hitler's reign 
Kentenich observed the rise of Nazism with concern, which he ranked among the products of what he called "the idealistic and mechanistic thinking" that engulfed Europe since nineteenth century like an oil spill.

In 1933, when the Nazis took power in Germany and closed religious houses one after the other, Father Kentenich took little time to send groups of  the Schoenstatt Sisters of Mary groups to South Africa, Brazil, Argentina, Chile, and Uruguay to allow the movement to survive in case the persecution of the Church in Germany intensified.

His opposition to Nazism attracted persecutory reactions towards him. Father Kentenich said about the swastika: "We, it is the Cross of the Christ that we follow." About Nazism, he said, "I see no place where the water of baptism could run there".

On 20 September 1941, Kentenich was arrested by the Gestapo in Koblenz and subsequently sent to Dachau concentration camp.  He spent over 3 years in the camp, where he became a support for many people, especially among the priests, and according to firsthand accounts, he guided many prisoners to show compassion, to be good men even in the midst of certain death. In Dachau, new branches of the Schoenstatt Movement, including its first international and family branches, were founded.

Arrest by the Gestapo 
Once in power, the Nazis were quick to classify Schoenstatt among the main opponents to destroy. After endless vexations, on 20 September 1941, Kentenich was summoned by the Gestapo; quoting some of his words spoken in private, but reported by an informer: "My mission is to reveal the inner emptiness of National Socialism, and by there to defeat it." The police imprisoned him for a month in a cell without ventilation, in order to break his resistance. This was a small massive concrete cell without any opening than the door. Father Kentenich was kept for four weeks in this dark and airless bunker, which was previously the vault of a branch of the Reichsbank. He left physically debilitated, but calm and peaceful as before. He was then transferred to a prison in Koblenz, a former Carmelite convent. He spent 5 months there, after which he was sent on to Dachau.

Sent to the Dachau concentration camp 

In March 1942, Kentenich was sent to the Dachau concentration camp at a moment when the living conditions there were worsening. Of the 12,000 prisoners, there were 2,600 priests. He was inmate number 29392. The Germans were grouped in a block where they have the right to attend daily Mass celebrated by one of them; it is only on 19 March 1943 that  Kentenich would finally celebrate his first Mass at the camp. He gave a nightly spiritual conference to his fellow prisoners thanks to the protection of the "kapo" (inmate block chief) Guttmann, a Communist with a rather violent temper, but fascinated by the behavior of the Father. Guttman saw Kentenich sharing his meager daily bread and soup with a detainee in need. Guttmann will save the priest who is destined to die in the gas chamber because of his poor health. On the day of the selection visit by an S.S. physician, the kapo hides Father Kentenich; assigned to the disinfection commando, he can now circulate in the camp.

Foundation of Schoenstatt International at Dachau 
On 16 July 1942 two new Schoenstatt branches were created at Dachau under the responsibility of two lay deportees: the Secular Institute of the Families and the Institute of the Brothers of Mary. Transferred into various blocks, Kentenich restarted his apostleship each time despite the personal risk he incurred. Over the last three months of 1944, the tightening of the Nazi regime and epidemics cause the death of 10,000 prisoners in Dachau. It was at this point that, in a surprising act of faith and hope in this hellish place, Father Kentenich formed,  with a group of disciples, the International Movement which extended the foundation of Schoenstatt out into the world. He wrote under unimaginable material conditions treaties of spirituality, prayers, and a didactic poem of over 20,000 verses. In December, Bishop Gabriel Piguet, a French prisoner, ordained under the highest secrecy a priest Blessed Karl Leisner, a seminarian from Schoenstatt. Suffering from tuberculosis and very weakened, Leisner will celebrate only one Mass before dying; he will be beatified by John Paul II on 23 June 1996.

On 6 April 1945, upon the arrival of American troops, the prisoners are released. On 20 May, at the feast of Pentecost, Father Kentenich returned to Schoenstatt. He immediately restarted his work, in order to establish a barrier against those whom he considered the biggest dangers to the world: communism in the East, and practical materialism in the West. The experience of deportation helped him teach his disciples on how to maintain inner freedom. Fathers Albert Eise and Franz Reinisch, two martyrs from Schoenstatt, the first who died from disease in Dachau, the second executed by the Nazis, were invoked as heavenly protectors by all members of the Movement.

International development of Schoenstatt 

In March 1947, Father Kentenich was received in a private audience by Pope Pius XII. He thanked the Pope for the publication, two days earlier, of the constitution Provida Mater Ecclesia, which created the Secular Institutes.In October 1948, the Holy See erected in a Secular Institute the Schoenstatt Sisters of Mary. At the same time, Kentenich traveled to Brazil, Chile, Argentina, Uruguay, the United States, and Africa to establish the movement there, with the construction of replicas of the Schoenstatt Shrine, training centers, and religious houses.

Exile 
However, opposition continued to grow against the movement whose presence and reach engendered jealousy. These opponents did not focus on points of doctrine, but primarily on terms used in certain prayers and the role of the founder that were deemed too exclusive. The Bishop of Trier, in whose diocese Schoenstatt is located, ordered a canonical visitation. The overall visitor's report praised the movement, but made some minor criticisms to which Father Kentenich was invited to reply. He raised the debate by writing a long document on the work of Schoenstatt which was presented as a cure for the disease of Western thought, idealism.

For Kentenich, Schoenstatt was an antidote to this poison, because it is not an abstract theory but a practical application of Christian doctrine. However, his long response upset the Apostolic Visitor, who sent the file to the Holy Office in Rome. In 1951, Father Tromp, a Dutch Jesuit, was appointed Apostolic Inspector with extensive powers. Baffled by the unconventional terminology used by Father Kentenich, he accused him of being an agitator, an innovator, and even a sectarian. After being stripped of all his functions in the movement, Kentenich was assigned a residence in the convent of Pallottines in Milwaukee; all further correspondence with the leaders of the work was prohibited.

More than three decades later, when witnesses were examined for the cause of Father Kentenich's beatification, a 78-year-old priest still in office declared, "Kentenich never received any official act of indictment. There was no official lawyer and he was never brought before a judge, much less faced a complainant or a witness." His exile lasted fourteen years. However, Kentenich accepted the punishment and writes: "God does not speak clearly by events? The Church wants to test our obedience, to recognize that if the work and the holder of the work are marked by God."

In 1959, Father Kentenich was appointed as parish priest of the German-speaking Catholic community of Milwaukee, with many immigrants from that nation. "He spoke about the Heavenly Father, will say some of his parishioners, as we had never heard anyone to do it."

In 1953, Pope Pius XII, by suggestion, refused to dissolve Schoenstatt. The status of the movement became a matter of whether it should be integrated into the Congregation of the Pallottines, or have its autonomy. The superiors of the Order advocated for the first option, but other Pallottines agreed with Father Kentenich that Schoenstatt should be fully autonomous under penalty of wither. In 1962, under the intervention of several bishops, John XXIII entrusted the case to the Congregation for Religious.

Return from exile 
In December 1963, Pope Paul VI appointed Bishop Höffner, from Münster, as moderator and protector of Schoenstatt. A new apostolic visitor is appointed, who delivered a favorable report. In 1964, under the unanimous opinion of the German bishops, a papal decree declared the separation of Schoenstatt from the Pallottines.

In October 1965, Father Kentenich was reinstated at the direction of the Movement. Now in his eighties, he was received by Paul VI a few days after the closing of the Second Vatican Council. He predicted that the council "will bear fruit, but will have first negative effects, because of the uncertainty of large sections of the hierarchy, clergy and laity about the image of the Church... This uncertainty can be overcome by turning our eyes to Mary, the first image and Mother of the Church.

His last actions in Schoenstatt: a father to many 
On Christmas of 1965, Father Kentenich, his face now adorned with a long white beard, was enthusiastically welcomed at Schoenstatt. His work now included five secular institutes: the Schoenstatt Fathers, the Diocesan Priests, the Brothers of Mary, the Sisters of Mary, the Ladies of Schoenstatt, and the Families. This also encompassed the several Federations and Leagues gathering priests, lay people, and families. Kentenich now devoted his strength to exert his spiritual fatherhood for all.

An influential theology in the years after the council demanded an "adult faith", the autonomy of the individual, the application of the democratic principle in the Church. In opposition to these ideas in fashion, Father Kentenich stressed the fatherhood of God and that of the priesthood in the Church, especially the episcopate. Originating from charity, the fatherhood is also the principle of authority, and implies obedience. The motherly presence of Mary is another essential point of the movement; the practical way to live it is the covenant of love with the Mother Thrice Admirable.
In a speech at the annual conference of German Catholics in 1967, Father Kentenich said: "We are living in apocalyptic times... Heavenly and devilish powers clash in this earth... This confrontation is to challenge the domination of the world; today this is clearly visible." The solution is to appeal to the Virgin Mary, "favorite weapon in the hands of the living God".

Death
During his last year on earth, Kentenich constantly returned to this theme: "The task of Mary is to bring Christ to the world and the world to Christ... We are convinced that the great crises of the present times cannot be overcome without Mary" (12 September 1968).

On 15 September 1968, on the Feast of Our Lady of Sorrows, Kentenich celebrated Mass at the recently inaugurated Church of the Adoration, newly consecrated on the heights of Schoenstatt. Six hundred Sisters of Mary attended the ceremony. Back in the sacristy for the thanksgiving prayer just after Mass, he suffered a heart attack; after receiving the last sacraments he died minutes later.

His mortal remains are buried in the place where he took his last breath. On his tomb figure, according to his wish, is the inscription: Dilexit Ecclesiam ("He loved the Church"; Eph 5:25), influenced by the same inscription engraved on the tomb of Cardinal Gaspard Mermillod, Bishop of Geneva (Switzerland) in the 19th century who was exiled from his own country for 11 years for refusing to adhere to a national church separated from Rome.

Beatification process 
The process for his beatification was opened on 10 February 1975 in the Diocese of Trier, Germany.
Life-size sculptures of Kentenich, created by American artist Gwendolyn Gillen, now stand outside Schoenstatt chapels in Lamar, Texas, Pewaukee, Wisconsin, Rome, Puerto Rico and many other countries. On 3rd May 2022 the bishop of Trier announced that the process had been suspended because of allegations of abuse.

Investigations into accusations of sexual abuse 

In July 2020, Alexandra von Teuffenbach, a former professor at the Pontifical Lateran University and the Regina Apostolorum university, alleged that Kentenich manipulated and coerced community members, specifically from the Schoenstatt Sisters of Mary, into sexually inappropriate conduct. Von Teuffenbach cited particular accusations found in documents of the archives of the Congregation for the Doctrine of the Faith after Pope Francis had allowed the consultation of documents concerning the pontificate of Pius XII. Von Teuffenbach claims that these accusations are the reason for which Kentenich was investigated by Fr. Sebastiaan Tromp, Apostolic Visitator from the Holy See, in the 1950s and eventually separated from the Schoenstatt Movement during his exile from 1951-1965.

The possibility of sexual or psychological abuse was strongly denied by the General Presidency of the Schoenstatt Movement. In a formal statement the movement indicated that the allegations had long been known about and the fact that Kentenich was reinstated from exile by the Vatican in 1965 was evidence that the allegations were not considered true. It was also stated that at the opening of Kentenich's process of beatification in 1975 a nihil obstat ("no obstructions") was granted by the church and that this would not have been granted if the previously known accusations were found to have any substance.

The Schoenstatt Sisters of Mary also released their own formal statement, as von Teuffenbach's discovery concerned their community in particular. The Sisters emphatically rejected the accusations and said that "successive generations of our community have experienced the founder as an authentic and credible personality.” Like the statement from Schoenstatt's General Presidency, the Sisters were already aware of the allegations made against Kentenich and emphasized that when he was reinstated as the founder and returned from his exile in 1965, all accusations had already been considered by the Church and deemed insufficiently substantiated to make a formal accusation.

A few days after the reports and responses, the postulator of Kentenich's cause and key representatives of Schoenstatt met with Bishop Stephan Ackermann of the Diocese of Trier. The end result was an announcement of an independent commission of historians, organized by the diocese, to review the beatification process of Kentenich, a decision that was welcomed by Fr. Juan Pablo Catoggio, international president of the Schoenstatt Movement. It will also be the task of the commission "to reconcile the newly found material with what has already been gathered and evaluated from other archives by the previous commission." At the end of their work, the commission "will write a report in which a statement will also be made about the personality and spirituality of Fr. Josef Kentenich as depicted in the collected documents."

Reacting to the announcement, Fr. Catoggio issued a statement addressed to the “Schoenstatt Family throughout the world” on July 8, saying that “we very much welcome this decision of the bishop," since in this way "the clarification of the questions regarding the person and actions of Father Kentenich” can be found.

Fr. Eduardo Aguirre, postulator for the cause of beatification of Kentenich, pointed out that Kentenich was not formally accused by the Holy Office, at that time the highest tribunal of the Church, at any time before, during, or after the exile for immoral conduct of any form, including the mention of sexual misconduct or deviance of any kind. Aguirre claims that "any assertion to the contrary is simple false."

See also
 Karl Leisner 
 John Pozzobon 
 Franz Reinisch 
 Francisco Javier Errázuriz Ossa
 Schoenstatt Shrine
 Pilgrim Mother Campaign

References

External links 
 Official Secretariat of Joseph Kentenich's canonization campaign
 The founder: Joseph Kentenich
 Heavenwards -  collection of writings of Fr. Kentenich during his detention in Dachau
 Fr. Kentenich's writings downloadable at the Schoenstatt Cloud

1885 births
1968 deaths
People from Erftstadt
Dachau concentration camp survivors
German Servants of God
Pallottines
20th-century German Roman Catholic priests
20th-century venerated Christians
Catholic Church sexual abuse scandals in Germany